Joseph John McNerney (born 24 January 1990) is an English professional footballer who plays as a defender for National League club Woking.

Early life
McNerney was born in Chertsey.

Club career

Woking
After joining Woking's academy at the age of 16, McNerney made his professional debut in a 1–0 away defeat against Altrincham on 21 February 2009, replacing Charlie Moone with four minutes remaining. McNerney went onto appear two more times for the Cards in his debut season, before enjoying two successful loan spells at Corinthian-Casuals and Ashford Town in the 2009–10 campaign.

McNerney became a key figure in Woking's promotion bid in the 2010–11 campaign, appearing in forty-nine games in all competitions, including six in their impressive FA Cup run, which saw the Cards lose on penalties to League One side Brighton & Hove Albion in a first-round replay. The following season saw McNerney and Woking win promotion back to the Conference Premier after a three-year absence, sealing the title on 14 April 2012, in a 1–0 home victory against Maidenhead United. In September 2014, after impressing for the Cards, McNerney received a call-up for the England C squad. However, the centre-half failed to appear in both games against Turkey A2 and Estonia U23, remaining as an unused substitute. McNerney went on to make over 120 league appearances in the next three years, before leaving the Surrey-based side in 2015.

Crawley Town
On 19 June 2015, McNerney joined League Two side Crawley Town on a two-year deal after impressing whilst at Woking. After being assigned the number five jersey, McNerney made his debut in Crawley's 1–1 away draw against Oxford United, featuring for the entire 90 minutes. On 10 October 2015, McNerney supposedly dislocated his kneecap after landing awkwardly from a jump in a match against Leyton Orient. However, a month later, it was revealed that the injury was not as bad as first thought. On 28 March 2016, McNerney made his return from his long-term injury, in a 2–0 home defeat against Exeter City, replacing Jon Ashton with just over ten minutes remaining. On 9 April 2016, McNerney went onto score his first Crawley goal in their reverse home fixture against Oxford United, which resulted in a 5–1 shock defeat, with the centre-half netting the opener in the 28th minute.

On 6 August 2016, McNerney made his first appearance of the 2016–17 campaign, in a 1–0 home victory over Wycombe Wanderers. Two weeks later, McNerney scored Crawley's equaliser in their 1–1 home draw with Barnet after John Akinde had given the visitors the lead in the 3rd minute. A couple of weeks after scoring in Crawley's away victory over Wycombe Wanderers, McNerney was rewarded with a new two-year contract, with the option for a third-year.

On 18 May 2021, it was announced that McNerney would leave the club upon the expiry of his contract following a six-year spell.

Return to Woking
On 7 June 2021, following his release from Crawley, McNerney opted to return to his boyhood club, Woking on a two-year deal. On 21 August 2021, McNerney made his return in a Woking shirt, playing the full 90 minutes during their 2–1 away victory against Wealdstone on the opening day of the 2021–22 campaign.

International career
In September 2014, McNerney was called up to the England C team for International Challenge Trophy qualifying fixtures the following month. He won one England C cap.

Career statistics

Honours

Club
Woking
Conference South: 2011–12

References

External links

1990 births
Living people
English footballers
Association football defenders
Woking F.C. players
Corinthian-Casuals F.C. players
Ashford Town (Middlesex) F.C. players
Crawley Town F.C. players
National League (English football) players
English Football League players
Sportspeople from Chertsey
Footballers from Surrey
England semi-pro international footballers